Avoca Island is an island located off the Intracoastal Waterway in the Morgan City Bayous near Morgan City, Louisiana, United States. It is home to many wildlife species. Part of the island is industrialized following the slow expansion of the city. Over 400 head of cattle reside on the island and Jim Bowie once herded cattle here in the nineteenth century. 
John Thompson received Avoca Island as a land bounty in 1870. The federal government gave no bounty land for service after 1855, but Union veterans of the Civil War received special homestead rights in 1870, when an amendment to the 1862 Homestead Act gave them the right to claim 160 acres within railroad grant areas (other homesteaders got only 80). Thompson and his family worked the land as fishers, hunters, and trappers until his death in 1915. His widow, unable to pay the taxes on the land,lost the land shortly thereafter.

The island is also home to the Avoca Duck Club, founded in 1937.

After the discovery of oil, the African American residents of Avoca Island were kicked off by officials and their houses dozed. Oil companies were then allowed to drill for oil on the island. The island today is home to only one resident with one ferry that brings people on and off the island. Alongside oil companies, a few private hunting clubs also have interests there.

References

Islands of Louisiana
Landforms of St. Mary Parish, Louisiana